Amit Vij (born 9 November 1977) is an Indian politician and a member of Indian National Congress. In 2017, he was elected as the member of the Punjab Legislative Assembly from Pathankot but in 2022, he lost the seat from BJP's Ashwani Sharma.

Constituency
Vij represents the Pathankot. Vij won the Pathankot on an INC ticket, Vij beat the member of the Punjab Legislative Assembly Ashwani Kumar Sharma of the BJP by over 11170 votes. But in 2022 Elections, he lost the seat against Ashwani Sharma, BJP Candidate.

Political party
Vij is from the INC and former MLA of Pathankot.

References

People from Pathankot district
Living people
Punjab, India MLAs 2017–2022
1977 births
Indian National Congress politicians from Punjab, India